The 2011 888.com Premier League Darts was a darts tournament organised by the Professional Darts Corporation; the seventh edition of the tournament.

The tournament began at The O2 Arena in London on 10 February and finished at the Wembley Arena on 19 May.

The format was a double round robin tournament with the top four finishers moving on to the play-offs. Each league match was played over 14 legs. If a player won his eighth leg before the 14th leg, no further legs were played after this point. Two points were awarded for a win and one point awarded for a draw.

Gary Anderson won his first major title, defeating world champion Adrian Lewis 10–4 in the final. He is the first player to win the title on his debut appearance (except from the inaugural tournament) and this was the first final to feature neither of the top 2 players from the group stage.

This edition of the Premier League contained the most non-English players ever to compete in the same edition of the tournament at four (Raymond van Barneveld, Gary Anderson, Simon Whitlock and Mark Webster).

Mark Webster recorded the worst ever run of matches from weeks 7–11, winning just 6 legs in 5 matches, in a run that culminated in his failure to win any of his last 10 matches and finish with just 5 points and −49 leg difference, the worst ever record from a Premier League season. This stood until Glen Durrant was eliminated with nine consecutive losses and 0 points in the 2021 edition of the tournament.

Qualification
The PDC's top four players following the Ladbrokes.com World Darts Championship on 4 January qualified by right to compete in Premier League Darts, and were joined by four wild card selections. Two were chosen by the PDC and two wild card qualifiers by broadcasters Sky Sports. The line-up was confirmed on 4 January 2011.

WC = Wild Card

Venues
Fifteen venues were used for the 2011 Premier League, with the only change being The O2 Arena giving London a second venue, replacing Coventry.

Prize money
The prize fund remained at £410,000 for the 2011 tournament.

Results

League stage
On 4 January 2011, the PDC announced via their official website that Phil Taylor would play against Adrian Lewis on the opening event of the League on 10 February. Lewis subsequently defeated Taylor 8–2 on the opening night. Coincidentally, this turned out to be Taylor's only loss of the league phase, as he went on to win 13 consecutive games. On 12 January the PDC's website released the fixtures.

10 February – Week 1
 The O2 Arena, London

17 February – Week 2
 Capital FM Arena, Nottingham

24 February – Week 3
 Odyssey Arena, Belfast

3 March – Week 4
 Westpoint Arena, Exeter

10 March – Week 5
 MEN Arena, Manchester

17 March – Week 6
 SECC, Glasgow

24 March – Week 7
 Brighton Centre, Brighton

31 March – Week 8
 Cardiff International Arena, Cardiff

7 April – Week 9
 AECC, Aberdeen

14 April – Week 10
 Motorpoint Arena, Sheffield

21 April – Week 11
 National Indoor Arena, Birmingham

28 April – Week 12
 Echo Arena, Liverpool

5 May – Week 13
 Bournemouth International Centre, Bournemouth

12 May – Week 14
 Metro Radio Arena, Newcastle upon Tyne

Play-offs – 19 May
 Wembley Arena, London

Table and Streaks

Table
Final table statistics: 

Top four qualified for the Play-offs after Week 14.NB: LWAT = Legs Won Against Throw. Players separated by +/- leg difference if tied.

Streaks

NB: W = Won
D = Drawn
L = Lost
N/A = Did not play

Player statistics
The following statistics are for the league stage only. Playoffs are not included.

Phil Taylor
Longest unbeaten run: 13
Most consecutive wins: 13
Most consecutive draws: 0
Most consecutive losses: 1
Longest without a win: 1
Biggest victory: 8–1 (v. James Wade and v. Mark Webster)
Biggest defeat: 2–8 (v. Adrian Lewis)

Raymond van Barneveld
Longest unbeaten run: 5
Most consecutive wins: 3
Most consecutive draws: 2
Most consecutive losses: 2
Longest without a win: 2
Biggest victory: 8–2 (v. James Wade)
Biggest defeat: 3–8 (v. Phil Taylor (twice))

Gary Anderson
Longest unbeaten run: 4
Most consecutive wins: 4
Most consecutive draws: 1
Most consecutive losses: 3
Longest without a win: 3
Biggest victory: 8–1 (v. Mark Webster (twice))
Biggest defeat: 3–8 (v. Adrian Lewis and v. Phil Taylor)

Adrian Lewis
Longest unbeaten run: 4
Most consecutive wins: 2
Most consecutive draws: 1
Most consecutive losses: 3
Longest without a win: 3
Biggest victory: 8–1 (v. Mark Webster)
Biggest defeat: 2–8 (v. Mark Webster)

James Wade
Longest unbeaten run: 4
Most consecutive wins: 3
Most consecutive draws: 1
Most consecutive losses: 3
Longest without a win: 3
Biggest victory: 8–1 (v. Mark Webster)
Biggest defeat: 1–8 (v. Phil Taylor)

Simon Whitlock
Longest unbeaten run: 3
Most consecutive wins: 3
Most consecutive draws: 1
Most consecutive losses: 3
Longest without a win: 5
Biggest victory: 8–1 (v. Terry Jenkins)
Biggest defeat: 2–8 (v. Adrian Lewis)

Terry Jenkins
Longest unbeaten run: 2
Most consecutive wins: 1
Most consecutive draws: 1
Most consecutive losses: 3
Longest without a win: 6
Biggest victory: 8–4 (v. Mark Webster (twice))
Biggest defeat: 1–8 (v. Simon Whitlock)

Mark Webster 
Longest unbeaten run: 1
Most consecutive wins: 1
Most consecutive draws: 1
Most consecutive losses: 8
Longest without a win: 10
Biggest victory: 8–2 (v. Adrian Lewis)
Biggest defeat: 1–8 (v. Gary Anderson (twice), v. Adrian Lewis, v. Phil Taylor and v. James Wade)

References

External links
PDC Premier League Darts

Premier League Darts
Premier League
Premier League Darts